Dadaji Dagadu Bhuse is a member of the 13th Maharashtra Legislative Assembly. He represents the Malegaon Outer Assembly Constituency. He belongs to the Shiv Sena. It is Bhuse's fourth term as Member of Legislative Assembly. In December 2014, he was appointed Minister of State for Co-operation.

Positions held
 2004: Elected to Maharashtra Legislative Assembly (1st term)
 2009: Re-Elected to Maharashtra Legislative Assembly (2nd term)
 2014: Re-Elected to Maharashtra Legislative Assembly (3rd term)
 2014 - 2016: Minister of State for Co-operation in Maharashtra State Government
 2014 - 2019: Guardian minister of Dhule District
 2016 - 2019: Minister of State for Rural Development in Maharashtra State Government.
 2019: Re-Elected to Maharashtra Legislative Assembly (4th term)
 2019: Appointed Minister of Agriculture, Ex Soldiers Welfare
 2020: Appointed guardian minister of Palghar district

See also
 Uddhav Thackeray ministry
 Devendra Fadnavis ministry

References

External links
 Shivsena Home Page
 http://www.rediff.com/news/report/fadnavis-ministry-expansion-sees-mix-of-old-and-new-faces/20141205.htm
 http://www.dnaindia.com/mumbai/report-maharashtra-cm-devendra-fadnavis-team-portfolios-allocated-bjp-retains-key-departments-2041510
 Malegaon outer constituency results 2009 and 2014
 Profile of Maharashtra government ministers 

Maharashtra MLAs 2014–2019
Living people
Shiv Sena politicians
Year of birth missing (living people)
People from Nashik district
Maharashtra MLAs 2004–2009
Maharashtra MLAs 2009–2014
Marathi politicians